The 2015–16 CAA men's basketball season marked the 31st season of Colonial Athletic Association basketball, taking place between November 2015 and March 2016.  Practices commenced in October 2015, and the season ended with the 2016 CAA men's basketball tournament.

Preseason

Preseason Poll

Preseason All-Conference Teams

Colonial Athletic Association Preseason Player of the Year: Juan'ya Green, Hofstra

Regular season

Head coaches
 Earl Grant, Charleston
 Monté Ross, Delaware
 Bruiser Flint, Drexel
 Matt Matheny, Elon
 Joe Mihalich, Hofstra
 Matt Brady, James Madison
 Bill Coen, Northeastern
 Pat Skerry, Towson
 Kevin Keatts, UNC Wilmington
 Tony Shaver, William & Mary

Rankings

Postseason

Colonial Athletic Association tournament

  March 4–7, 2016: Colonial Athletic Association Men's Basketball Tournament, Royal Farms Arena, Baltimore, Maryland

UNC Wilmington defeated Hofstra, 80–73 (OT), in the finals of the 2016 CAA men's basketball tournament to win the conference, and earn an automatic bid to the 2016 NCAA Men's Division I Basketball Tournament.

NCAA tournament

The CAA had one bid to the 2016 NCAA Men's Division I Basketball Tournament, that being the automatic bid of UNC Wilmington by winning the conference tournament.

National Invitation tournament 

The CAA had one bid to the 2016 National Invitation Tournament, that being the automatic bid of Hofstra by winning the conference's regular season championship.

Vegas 16 tournament 

Towson was invited to play in the 2016 Vegas 16 Tournament.

College Basketball Invitational 

No teams from the CAA accepted bids to play in the 2016 College Basketball Invitational.

CollegeInsider.com Postseason tournament 

No teams from the CAA accepted bids to play in the 2016 CollegeInsider.com Postseason Tournament.

Awards and honors

Regular season

CAA Player-of-the-Week

 Nov. 16 – Shakir Brown (James Madison), David Walker (Northeastern)
 Nov. 23 – Canyon Barry (Charleston), Juan'ya Green (Hofstra)
 Nov. 30 – Quincy Ford (Northeastern)
 Dec. 7  – Tanner Samson (Elon)
 Dec. 14 – Canyon Barry (Charleston) (2), Marvin King-Davis (Delaware)
 Dec. 21 – Ron Curry (James Madison), Kory Holden (Delaware)
 Dec. 28 – Canyon Barry (Charleston) (3), Quincy Ford (Northeastern) (2)
 Jan. 4  – Quincy Ford (Northeastern) (3), Juan'ya Green (Hofstra) (2)
 Jan. 11 – Terry Tarpey (William & Mary)
 Jan. 18 – Chris Flemmings (UNCW), Rokas Gustys (Hofstra)
 Jan. 25 – Juan'ya Green (Hofstra) (3)
 Feb. 1  – Chris Flemmings (UNCW) (2)
 Feb. 8  – Ron Curry (James Madison) (2), Omar Prewitt (William & Mary)
 Feb. 15 – Rokas Gustys (Hofstra) (2)
 Feb. 22 – Quincy Ford (Northeastern) (4), Juan'ya Green (Hofstra) (4)
 Feb. 29  – Juan'ya Green (Hofstra) (5)

CAA Rookie-of-the-Week

 Nov. 16 – Terrell Allen (Drexel)
 Nov. 23 – Dainan Swoope (Elon)
 Nov. 30 – C. J. Bryce (UNCW)
 Dec. 7  – Nick Harris (Charleston)
 Dec. 14 – Jeremy Miller (Northeastern)
 Dec. 21 – Tyler Seibring (Elon)
 Dec. 28 – C. J. Bryce (UNCW) (2)
 Jan. 4  – Jarrell Brantley (Charleston)
 Jan. 11 – Tyler Seibring (Elon) (2)
 Jan. 18 – Tyler Seibring (Elon) (3)
 Jan. 25 – C. J. Bryce (UNCW) (3)
 Feb. 1  – Marquise Pointer (Charleston)
 Feb. 8  – C. J. Bryce (UNCW) (4)
 Feb. 15 – Jarrell Brantley (Charleston) (2)
 Feb. 22 – Terrell Allen (Drexel) (2)
 Feb. 29 – Jarrell Brantley (Charleston) (3)

Postseason

CAA All-Conference Teams and Awards

References